Blood & Chocolate is the eleventh studio album by the British rock singer and songwriter Elvis Costello, released in the United Kingdom as Demon Records XFIEND 80, and in the United States as Columbia 40518. It is his ninth album with his long-standing backing band known as 'The Attractions'. After his previous album King of America with producer T-Bone Burnett and different musicians, this album reunited him with producer Nick Lowe and his usual backing group the Attractions. It peaked at No. 16 on the UK Albums Chart, and No. 84 on the Billboard 200.  In The Village Voices annual Pazz & Jop critics poll for the year's best albums, Blood & Chocolate finished at number 9. The album was also included in the book 1001 Albums You Must Hear Before You Die.
In 2000 it was voted number 475 in Colin Larkin's All Time Top 1000 Albums.

The recording of Blood & Chocolate was troubled, as the relationship between Costello and the Attractions had deteriorated during sessions for King of America. The album was recorded at concert-level volume in a way Costello felt suited the material.

Background and recording
Six months after the Los Angeles sessions for King of America, Costello returned to the studio with the Attractions to work on the songs for this album. Costello reported the band's relationship as having "soured", and after the album's completion and one more tour, Costello would not work again with the Attractions for another eight years, until Brutal Youth. Costello explained, "It was recorded just over six months after the Hollywood sessions for King of America. The Attractions' sole contribution to that album, 'Suit of Lights,' had been made during our least successful and most bad-tempered days in the studio. The air of suspicion and resentment still lingered as King of America was released and we entered Olympic Studios, London, to make what proved to be our last record together for eight years."

Recording at Olympic Studios in London, several songs were re-workings from those earlier L.A. sessions, including "Blue Chair", "I Hope You're Happy Now", and "American Without Tears No. 2". An outtake from these sessions, a cover of the 1959 hit by Little Willie John "Leave My Kitten Alone", had also been an outtake for the Beatles during the sessions for Beatles for Sale.

Blood & Chocolate was recorded in a single large room at high volume, with the band listening to each other on monitor speakers and playing at stage volume, an unusual practice in the studio for its time. As Costello recalled, "Nick Lowe was producing us for the first time in five years and, together with engineer Colin Fairley, agreed to an approach that would get the music recorded before the band and I fell out completely. Olympic's control room still contained some of the Bakelite switches and other arcane features left over from the days when it had hosted sessions by Jimi Hendrix and The Rolling Stones. The live room was big enough for a full orchestra, so we filled it with our live monitor system and played at something approaching stage volume. Although it is commonly thought that high volume in the studio creates an uncontrollable sonic picture, this approach seemed to suit the material entirely."

Packaging
As on his previous album, Costello uses three different names to credit himself: his given name of Declan MacManus; his stage name of Elvis Costello; and the nickname Napoleon Dynamite, his alter ego as master of ceremonies for the Attractions' spinning songbook tour. The name "Napoleon Dynamite" would later be used for a 2004 cult film by Jared Hess, who denies that the title was inspired by Blood & Chocolate.

The album uses Esperanto to list musician credits and LP sides. The line in Tokyo Storm Warning "Japanese God-Jesus robots telling teenage fortunes" refers to a real toy made by Bandai. Elvis Costello created the cover of the album himself.

Release
The album was released initially on vinyl, CD and cassette in 1986, with a reissue, courtesy of Rykodisc Records in the U.S. and Demon Records in the U.K., arriving nine years later with six bonus tracks, including the 1987 single version of "Blue Chair" recorded during the King of America sessions. A 10,000-copy limited-edition version of this release came with a bonus disc entitled An Overview Disc, consisting of a 78-minute interview with Peter Doggett, conducted on 21 July 1995, in which Costello and Doggett discuss his career and releases up to 1986. Five of the six Rykodisc bonus tracks, minus "A Town Called Big Nothing", along with ten others, appeared as the second disc to the double-disc Rhino Records reissue in 2002. These reissues are out of print; the album was reissued again by Universal Music Group after its acquisition of Costello's complete catalogue in 2006.

The tracks "Tokyo Storm Warning", "I Want You", and "Blue Chair" were all released as singles. The "Blue Chair" single was not the recording from the album, but an earlier one made with T-Bone Burnett during the King of America sessions with the Confederates band. "Tokyo Storm Warning" peaked at No. 73 on the UK Singles Chart but missed the Billboard Hot 100. The other two singles did not chart in either nation. Except for a compilation released in the UK, Out of Our Idiot, this album would be the final release on his Demon/Columbia contract, Costello signing with Warner Brothers for his next LP, Spike.

The UK CD included an alternative mix of "Uncomplicated" which "lacks the anvil sound after the 'horse that knows arithmetic' line and a guitar part from the guitar break near the end." This version is also available on the CD-only release of Girls + Girls + Girls.

Content

Musical style 
Will Birch likened the record's sound to the then-embryonic grunge style, proclaiming it to be "six or eight years ahead of its time." Similarly, Blood & Chocolate was described by Goldmine Magazine as a "brash, grungy" effort on 7 April 1989, and in September 2007 as "ferocious and grungy" by Q Magazine. AllMusic cataloged Blood & Chocolate a "straight-ahead rock & roll" album, while acknowledging lesser elements of folk and country.

Lyrical themes 
Alluding to Blood & Chocolate'''s lyrical content, Blender detailed "blistering songs about sexual despair and disgust."

 Critical reception 

In a 4 out-of 5 star AllMusic review, Stephen Thomas Erlewine lauded Blood & Chocolate as "lively" and "frequently compelling."Blood & Chocolate was graded A- by Armond White of Entertainment Weekly in 1991, and praised as a  "blistering" and "wildly infectious" effort.

Track listing
All tracks written by Declan MacManus (Elvis Costello) except as noted; track timings taken from Rhino 2002 reissue.

1995 bonus tracks
 "Seven Day Weekend" (with Jimmy Cliff) (Costello, Cliff) – 2:39 released on the soundtrack to Club Paradise
 "Forgive Her Anything" – 3:12 session outtake
 "Blue Chair" – 3:41 single version
 "Baby's Got a Brand New Hairdo" – 3:26 B-side to the "Don't Let Me Be Misunderstood" single
 "American Without Tears No. 2" – 3:35 twilight version released as b-side to the "Blue Chair" single
 "A Town Called Big Nothing (Really Big Nothing)" – 5:44 session outtake
 "Return to Big Nothing" – 2:54 unlisted track

2002 bonus discTracks 1–6 are session outtakes; tracks 11–15 are solo demo recordings. "Leave My Kitten Alone" (Little Willie John, James McDougal, Titus Turner) – 3:24
 "New Rhythm Method" – 2:30
 "Forgive Her Anything" – 3:51 different take to the 1995 reissue version
 "Crimes of Paris" – 4:38
 "Uncomplicated" – 3:06
 "Battered Old Bird" – 4:24
 "Seven Day Weekend" (with Jimmy Cliff) (Costello, Cliff) – 2:39 released on the soundtrack to Club Paradise
 "Blue Chair" – 3:41 single version
 "Baby's Got a Brand New Hairdo" – 3:26 b-side to the "Don't Let Me Be Misunderstood" single
 "American Without Tears No. 2" – 3:35 twilight version released as b-side to the "Blue Chair" single
 "All These Things" (Allen Toussaint) – 3:04
 "Pouring Water on a Drowning Man" (Drew Baker, Dani McCormick) – 2:35
 "Running Out of Fools" (Richard Ahlert, Kay Rogers) – 2:35
 "Tell Me Right Now" (Joe Tex) – 3:06
 "Lonely Blue Boy" (Ben Weisman, Fred Wise) – 2:04

Personnel
 Elvis Costello – electric guitar, acoustic guitar, vocals, harmonium, tambourine, bellows, canes, knives, bass, Vox Continental electric organ
 Steve Nieve – piano, organ, harmonium
 Bruce Thomas – bass, electric guitar, saxophone
 Pete Thomas – drums, alto saxophone

Additional personnel
 Nick Lowe – acoustic guitar
 Cait O'Riordan – vocals on "Crimes of Paris" and "Poor Napoleon"
 Jimmy Cliff – vocals on "Seven Day Weekend"
 Mitchell Froom – organ on "Blue Chair" single version
 Tom "T-Bone" Wolk – electric guitar, bass on "Blue Chair" single version
 Mickey Curry – drums on "Blue Chair" single version

Cover versions
Los Lobos covered "Uncomplicated" on their 2004 EP Ride This.

The Art of Time Ensemble featuring (former Barenaked Ladies singer) Steven Page covered "I Want You" on their 2010 album A Singer Must Die''.

Notes and references

External links
 

Elvis Costello albums
1986 albums
Albums produced by Nick Lowe
Columbia Records albums
Hip-O Records albums
Rhino Records albums
Rykodisc albums